María Luisa Sánchez Bustamante de Urioste (19 August 1896 - 1 November 1988) was a Bolivian feminist and founder of the Ateneo Femenino, an organization which was crucial in the fight for equality in Bolivia. She was president of said organization, a position she maintained for twenty-eight consecutive years. She is the aunt of Gonzalo Sánchez de Lozada, who served as President of Bolivia on two occasions: (1993-1997) and (2002-2003).

Biography 

She was born to a family with a long political tradition in her country, being one of ten children of Daniel Sánchez Bustamante and Carmen Calvo Molina. Her siblings were: Vicente, Julio, Daniel, Isabel, Carmen, Mercedes, Luz, Javier and Jaime. She was married to Don Armando Julio Urioste Arana, a business magnate and industrialist that worked as General Manager of the Cement Society of La Paz and as Director of the Company of Constructions of La Paz.

Alongside the Ateneo Femenino, she pushed forward the legislation that gave women the right to vote in Bolivia.

References 

Bolivian feminists
1896 births
1988 deaths
People from Sucre